Bridgewater Heights (also known as Liberty Heights, Wakefield Street Tower, or 17 New Wakefield Street) is a skyscraper apartment building in Manchester, England, west of Oxford Street. It was designed by local architect Stephen Hodder in a clustered architectural form and was completed in September 2012. The skyscraper is situated adjacent to Oxford Road railway station, on the corner of Great Marlborough Street. The skyscraper is 37 storeys high at a height of 106 m (348 ft) and as of 2023 is the 16th-tallest building in Manchester.

History

Four development schemes were proposed for the site in four years. Plans for a  residential tower were proposed in 2006 featuring a design similar to the tower being built. However, despite obtaining planning approval, the proposal was abandoned. In December 2009, the project was revived with a plan for a  residential tower.

A planning application was made in early 2010, and planning consent granted in July 2010. Construction work began weeks after consent was granted. By November 2011, the tower had risen in height considerably, and on 18 April 2012, the tower had its topping out ceremony at a height of 106 m.

Upon opening, the building was named Student Castle, later renamed to Liberty Heights, and finally Bridgewater Heights.

Architecture
Bridgewater Heights is a residential development of high-rise flats aimed at young people and students. At 106 m (348 ft), it was the tallest purpose-built student accommodation in the world, until being overtaken by Altus House in Leeds, United Kingdom. Its apparent height is accentuated slightly by its position on a slope. The tower has some resemblance to the Mathematics Tower which also had a clustered exterior but was controversially demolished by the University of Manchester in 2005.

Plans for a residents' car park were rejected by planners concerned about the impact of a large building and busy location.

References

External links
Planning application for Wakefield Street Tower
Student Castle Manchester 

Buildings and structures in Manchester
Residential skyscrapers in England
Skyscrapers in Manchester
Residential buildings completed in 2012